The Getting of Wisdom is a 1977 Australian film directed by Bruce Beresford and based on the 1910 novel of the same title by Henry Handel Richardson.

The film is set in 1890s Victoria, when Laura (Susannah Fowle) enters an exclusive Melbourne ladies' college based on Methodist Ladies' College. The film follows her struggle for acceptance, conformity, romance, friendship and achievement over the next four years. Lesbian overtones between a schoolgirl and a music teacher are made explicit in the film, more so than in Richardson's novel.

It also starred Barry Humphries, John Waters and Terence Donovan, and featured early career appearances by Kerry Armstrong, Sigrid Thornton, Noni Hazlehurst, Maggie Kirkpatrick and Julia Blake.

A musical theme runs through the story, with piano works by Beethoven, Schubert and Thalberg played by Sarah Grunstein.

Plot
Laura Rambotham is sent to attend boarding school in Melbourne at the turn of the century. During her second year she tells everyone about a made-up romance between herself and the school's minister, Reverend Shepherd. She forms an attachment with an older student in her music class, Evelyn. When Evelyn leaves, Laura throws herself into her studies and wins the school literary and music prizes.

Cast
Susannah Fowle as Laura Tweedle Rambotham
Hilary Ryan as Evelyn
Terence Donovan as Tom McNamara
Patricia Kennedy as Miss Chapman
Sheila Helpmann as Mrs. Gurley
Candy Raymond as Miss Zielinski
Barry Humphries as Rev. Strachey
John Waters as Rev. Shepherd
Julia Blake as Isabella Shepherd
Diana Greentree as Maisie Shepherd
Monica Maughan as Miss Day
Dorothy Bradley as Miss Hicks
Kay Eklund as Mrs. Rambotham
Maggie Kirkpatrick as Sarah
Phillip Adams, cameo role as mathematics teacher
Kerry Armstrong as Kate, one of the worldly-wise students
Sigrid Thornton as Maria, one of the worldly-wise students
 Celia De Burgh as M.P.
Kim Deacon as Lilith
Alix Longman as Chinky
Jo-Anne Moore as Tilly
Amanda Ring as Cupid
Janet Shaw as Bertha
Karen Sutton as Pin, Laura's sister

Production
Bruce Beresford wanted to make the film after The Adventures of Barry McKenzie (1972) and tried to get finance from Reg Grundy. Grundy said he would think about it if Beresford made a McKenzie sequel. Beresford made Barry McKenzie Holds His Own (1974) but Grundy declined to make Wisdom.

The film was the first production from the newly formed Victorian Film Corporation, who provided $100,000 with additional funding from the Australian Film Commission and the Nine Network. Six thousand girls were interviewed for the school pupil roles. It was shot at the Methodist Ladies' College and in the town of Eddington in January and February 1977.

Production crew
Bruce Beresford – Director
Michael Lake- Assistant Director
Russel Karel – Production Manager
Donald Alpine – Director of Photography
John Stoddart – Production Designer
William Anderson- Editor
Anna Senior – Costume Designer
Desmond Bone-Sound Recording
Gary Wilkins- Sound Recording
Peter Fenton-Sound Mixing
Moya Iceton – Continuity

Box office
The Getting of Wisdom grossed $982,000 at the box office in Australia, which is equivalent to $4,517,200 in 2009 dollars.

Awards
The Getting of Wisdom was nominated for five AFI Awards in 1978 and won in the Best Adapted Screenplay (Eleanor Witcombe) category.

See also
Cinema of Australia

References

Further reading

 Tibbetts, John C., and James M. Welsh, eds. The Encyclopedia of Novels into Film (2nd ed. 2005) pp 150–151.

External links

The Getting of Wisdom at the Australian screen
The Getting of Wisdom at Oz Movies

1977 films
1977 drama films
Australian drama films
Films shot in Melbourne
Films about classical music and musicians
Films based on Australian novels
Films directed by Bruce Beresford
Films set in Melbourne
Films set in the Victorian era
Films set in colonial Australia
1970s English-language films